Valpuesta (Latin Valliposita or Valle Conposita) was a Catholic diocese in Castile in northern Spain. Today it is a titular see.

History 
According to unreliable documents in the cartularies of Valpuesta, the diocese was established in 804 as a suffragan of the Metropolitan Archdiocese of Tarragona. It was suppressed in 1087 and its territory merged into the then bishopric of Burgos (now a metropolitan Archdiocese).

List of bishops
 Juan (804)
 Felimir (876–881)
 Fredulf (884–890)
 Diego I (900)
 Diego II (929–957)
 Martin (963–992)
 Velasco (1008–1011)
 Sancho (1011–1022)
 Munio I (1024–1037)
 Ato (1037–1049)
 García (1049–1052)
 Gómez (1052–1065)
 Munio II (1065–1087)

Titular see of Valliposita 
The diocese was nominally revived in 1969 as a titular bishopric of the lowest (episcopal) rank.

It since has the following (near-)consecutive, so-far regular (not secular) incumbents, so far of the fitting Episcopal (lowest) rank:
 Louis La Ravoire Morrow, Salesians (S.D.B.) (born USA) (1969.10.31 – retired 1971.04.27) on emeritate as former Bishop of Krishnagar (India) (1939.05.25 – resigned 1969.10.31); died 1987
 Constantino José Lüers, Friars Minor (O.F.M.) (born Germany) (1973.04.13 – 1976.03.24) as Bishop-Prelate of Territorial Prelature of Óbidos (Brazil) (1973.04.13 – 1976.03.24), later Bishop of Penedo (Brazil) (1976.03.24 – retired 1994.01.26); died 1997
 Joseph Abel Francis, Divine Word Missionaries (S.V.D.) (1976.05.03 – death 1997.09.01) as Auxiliary Bishop of Newark (USA) (1976.05.03 – 1995.06.30) and on emeritate
 Angelito R. Lampon, Oblates of Mary Immaculate (O.M.I.) (1997.11.21 – 2018.11.06), as Apostolic Vicar of Jolo (Philippines), later Archbishop of Roman Catholic Archdiocese of Cotabato (Philippines) (2019.01.31 - ...).
Sebastián Chico Martinez, (2019.02.20 - ...), as Auxiliary Bishop of Roman Catholic Diocese of Cartagena (Spain).

References

Sources and external links 
 GigaCatholic, with Google satellite photo

Valliposita